Medicine Bow is a town in Carbon County, Wyoming, United States. Its population was 284 at the 2010 census.

History

The community largely owes its existence to the first transcontinental railroad, built through the area in 1868.  A post office called Medicine Bow has been in operation since 1869. The community was named after the Medicine Bow River.

Dippy, a well-known dinosaur skeleton, was found in a quarry nearby around 1898. In 1899, fossil hunters for the American Museum of Natural History and the Field Museum stayed in or near the town during their search for large dinosaur skeletons. The town had a railroad and was near the fossilferous sedimentary hills from the Jurassic Morrison Formation, making it an important stopping location for paleontologists, with fossils of Diplodocus and Brontosaurus found nearby at Como Bluff by the two institutions during the late 19th and early 20th centuries.

The town was noted to be plagued by crime, with famous bandits such as Butch Cassidy and his Wild Bunch enacting the Wilcox Train Robbery only a few miles away from the AMNH’s fossil localities and Medicine Bow itself.

The Virginian Hotel is a historic hotel located in Medicine Bow. It was built in 1911 by August Grimm. The hotel was added to the National Register of Historic Places in 1978.

In the 1910s, part of the Lincoln Highway was routed through Medicine Bow until Interstate 80 replaced it in 1970.

Geography
Medicine Bow is located at  (41.897668, -106.202796).

Climate

Demographics

As of 2000, the median income for a household in the town was $33,750, and for a family was $35,156. Males had a median income of $41,250 versus $20,536 for females. The per capita income for the town was $16,420. About 10.3% of families and 11.9% of the population were below the poverty line, including 9.2% of those under the age of eighteen and 17.5% of those 65 or over

2010 census
As of the census of 2010,  284 people, 125 households, and 81 families resided in the town. The racial makeup of the town was 95.1% White, 0.4% Pacific Islander, 3.9% from other races, and 0.7% from two or more races. Hispanics or Latinos of any race were 6.7% of the population.

Of the 125 households, 20.8% had children under 18 living with them, 50.4% were married couples living together, 7.2% had a female householder with no husband present, 7.2% had a male householder with no wife present, and 35.2% were not families. About 29.6% of all households were made up of individuals, and 18.4% had someone living alone who was 65 or older. The average household size was 2.27, and the average family size was 2.79.

The median age in the town was 49.3 years; 20.1% of residents were under 18; 3.5% were between 18 and 24; 21.1% were from 25 to 44; 29.9% were from 45 to 64; and 25.4% were 65 or older. The gender makeup of the town was 53.5% male and 46.5% female.

Economy
In December 2007, plans were announced for construction of a large coal gasification plant to be built southwest of town. The plant was expected to start construction in 2014. In 2014, DKRW Advanced Fuels terminated their contract with Sinopec, the Chinese firm that would have built the plant. In 2015, there were plans to downscale the plant, and in 2016, the project was put on indefinite hold, partly due to the low cost of crude oil in the US.

Education
Public education in the town of Medicine Bow is provided by Carbon County School District Number 2. Zoned campuses include Medicine Bow Elementary School (grades K–6) and H.E.M. Junior/Senior High School  (grades 7–12).

Medicine Bow has a public library, a branch of the Carbon County Library System.

In popular culture
Much of the Western novel The Virginian and subsequent television series of the same name were set in or near Medicine Bow.

Chapter XXVIII from Jules Verne's Around the World in Eighty Days involves a subplot about making a train pass through an unsafe bridge near Medicine Bow.

In the 1960 episode of the television series Maverick entitled "The Misfortune Teller", hero Bret Maverick is nearly lynched by the citizens of Medicine Bow, under the mistaken impression that he is a swindler and the murderer of their late mayor.

See also
 List of municipalities in Wyoming

References

Further reading
 Barrett, Glen. (1978) The Virginian at Medicine Bow.
 Roberts, David L. (1991) Sage Street: A Collection of Stories.

External links

 
 Medicine Bow wind farm

Towns in Carbon County, Wyoming
Towns in Wyoming